Tertali or teratali folk dance is performed by Kamar tribes.  It is an elaborate ritual with many different types of dance. It is generally performed by two or three women who sit on the ground. Manjiras (small metal cymbals) are tied to different parts of the body. The head is covered with a hat or petha. At times a small sword is clenched between the teeth and an ornamental pot is balanced on the head.

References

 

Dances of India
Rajasthani culture